CZA may refer to:

Central Zoo Authority of India
circumzenithal arc, or upside-down rainbow
Czapek agar, or Czapek medium, a growth medium for propagating fungi